Neotherium mirum is an extinct species of basal walrus. It was smaller than living forms and it did not have long tusks. Males were larger than females.

References

Miocene pinnipeds
Prehistoric carnivoran genera
Extinct mammals of North America
Extinct mammals of Asia
Odobenids
Fossil taxa described in 1931
Taxa named by Remington Kellogg